Floating Staircase is a ghost story/mystery novel  by American writer  Ronald Malfi.  It was published in 2011 by Medallion Press, with a limited edition hardcover collectors edition from Thunderstorm Books, which contained an original author's "Afterward" not in the paperback novel.  The novel was nominated by the Horror Writers Association for a Bram Stoker Award for Best Novel, and it won a Gold IPPY Award for best horror novel of 2011.

Synopsis
Following the success of his latest novel, Travis Glasgow and his wife Jodie buy their first house in the western Maryland town of Westlake, across the street from Travis' brother Adam and his family.  At first, everything is picture perfect, from the beautiful lake behind the house to the rebirth of the friendship between Travis and Adam. Travis also begins to overcome the darkness of his childhood and the guilt he's harboured since his younger brother's tragic drowning for which Travis holds himself responsible.  Soon, though, the new house begins to lose its allure. Strange noises wake Travis at night, and his dreams are plagued by ghosts. Barely glimpsed shapes flit through the darkened hallways, but strangest of all is the bizarre set of wooden stairs that rises cryptically out of the lake behind the house. Travis becomes drawn to the structure, but the more he investigates, the more he uncovers the truth about the Dentmans, the family who owned his house previously, and how young Elijah Dentman had drowned in the lake behind the house in circumstances eerily similar to Travis' brother.

Connections to other novels
The protagonist Travis Glasgow is also mentioned in Malfi's 2004 novel, The Fall of Never, although only peripherally, as the author of a novel titled Silent River.  This is the name of one of Travis Glasgow's books as mentioned in Floating Staircase.

In Chapter 17 of Floating Staircase, Travis hallucinates a dream in which he believes he is "married to a woman with a monster growing in her belly, and my name was Alan, and we lived by our own special lake in a different part of the country."  This is a direct reference to Alan Hammerstun, the protagonist in Malfi's novel Cradle Lake.  In Cradle Lake, Alan Hammerstun has a similar dream where he believes he is Travis Glasgow, although Travis's name is not used in that text.

Reception
The book received generally favorable reviews, with some reviewers touting it as "well-developed and unpredictable" and a "must-read novel."  A reviewer for the New York Journal of Books stated, "Floating Staircase deserves to stand alongside a Stephen King or a Dean Koontz--at their best...[it is] a mature horror yarn, but, deep down, it is also an exploration of obsessions, and in particular the obsession it takes to be a writer."  Publishers Weekly called the book's ending "surprising and expertly set up."

References

2011 American novels
American horror novels
Novels set in Maryland
Western Maryland